Ledebouria is a genus of African bulbous perennial herbs in the Asparagus family, Asparagaceae, subfamily Scilloideae. Most members were previously part of the genus Scilla. A number of species are grown by cacti and succulent enthusiasts for their patterned leaves.

Most of the species are native to Madagascar and Africa (except North Africa), but a few are from India, Sri Lanka or the Arabian Peninsula.

The genus name of Ledebouria is in honour of Carl Friedrich von Ledebour (1786–1851), a German-Estonian botanist.
It was first described and published in Nov. Pl. Sp. on page 194 in 1821.

Species 

Ledebouria apertiflora (Baker) Jessop
Ledebouria asperifolia (van der Merwe) S.Venter
 Ledebouria atrobrunnea S.Venter
 Ledebouria caesiomontana  Hankey & Hahn
 Ledebouria camerooniana (Baker) Speta
 Ledebouria concolor (Baker) Jessop
Ledebouria confusa S.Venter
 Ledebouria cooperi (Hook. f.) Jessop
 Ledebouria cordifolia (Baker) Stedje & Thulin
Ledebouria coriacea S.Venter
Ledebouria cremnophila S.Venter & van Jaarsv.
 Ledebouria crispa S.Venter
 Ledebouria dolomiticola S.Venter
 Ledebouria edulis (Engl.) Stedje
 Ledebouria ensifolia (Eckl.) S.Venter & T.J.Edwards
 Ledebouria floribunda (Baker) Jessop
 Ledebouria galpinii (Baker) S.Venter & T.J.Edwards
Ledebouria glauca S.Venter
 Ledebouria grandifolia (Balf.f.) A.G.Mill. & D.Alexander
 Ledebouria hyderabadensis  M.V.Ramana, Prasanna & Venu
 Ledebouria hypoxidioides (Schönland) Jessop
 Ledebouria inquinata (C. A. Sm.) Jessop
 Ledebouria insularis A.G.Mill.
Ledebouria karnatakensis Punekar & Lakshmin
 Ledebouria kirkii (Baker) Stedje & Thulin
Ledebouria lepida (N.E.Br.) S.Venter
Ledebouria leptophylla (Baker) S.Venter
 Ledebouria lilacina (Fenzl ex Kunth) Speta
 Ledebouria luteola Jessop
 Ledebouria macowanii (Baker) S.Venter
 Ledebouria maesta (Baker) Speta
 Ledebouria marginata (Baker) Jessop
 Ledebouria minima (Baker) S.Venter
 Ledebouria mokobulanensis A.J.Hankey and T.J.Edwards
Ledebouria monophylla S.Venter
Ledebouria nossibeensis (H.Perrier) J.C.Manning & Goldblatt
 Ledebouria ovalifolia (Schrad.) Jessop
 Ledebouria ovatifolia (Baker) Jessop
Ledebouria papillata S.Venter
Ledebouria pardalota S.Venter
 Ledebouria parvifolia S.Venter
Ledebouria pustulata S.Venter
Ledebouria remifolia S.Venter
 Ledebouria revoluta (L. f.) Jessop
Ledebouria rupestris (van der Merwe) S.Venter
 Ledebouria sandersonii (Baker) S.Venter & T.J.Edwards
 Ledebouria scabrida Jessop
 Ledebouria socialis (Baker) Jessop
 Ledebouria somaliensis (Baker) Stedje & Thulin
Ledebouria sudanica (A.Chev.) Burg in A.Akoègninou & al. 
 Ledebouria undulata (Jacq.) Jessop
 Ledebouria urceolata Stedje
Ledebouria venteri van Jaarsv. & A.E.van Wyk
 Ledebouria viscosa Jessop
 Ledebouria zambesiaca (Baker) Speta
Ledebouria zebrina (Baker) S.Venter

References 

 Manning, J. C. et al. 2004. A revised generic synopsis of Hyacinthaceae in sub-Saharan Africa, based on molecular evidence, including new combinations and the new tribe Pseudoprospereae. Edinburgh J. Bot.  60:533–568.
 Stedje, B. 1998. Phylogenetic relationships and generic delimitation of sub-Saharan Scilla (Hyacinthaceae) and allied African genera as inferred from morphological and DNA sequence data. Pl. Syst. Evol. 211:1–11.
 Venter, S. & V. J. Edwards. 1998. A revision of Ledebouria (Hyacinthaceae) in South Africa. 1. Two new species. Bothalia 28:15–17.
 Venter, S. & V. J. Edwards. 1998. A revision of Ledebouria (Hyacinthaceae) in South Africa. 2. Two new species, L. crispa and L. parvifolia, and L. macowanii re-instated. Bothalia 28:179–182.
 A.J. Hankeya and T.J. Edwards. Ledebouria mokobulanensis A.J.Hankey and T.J.Edwards (Hyacinthaceae) a new species from the high altitude grasslands of Mpumalanga. South African Journal of Botany, Volume 74, Issue 2, April 2008, Pages 214–217.

External links 

 WikiSpecies entry
 USDA Germplasm Resources Information Network
 Encyclopedia of Life
 Pacific Bulb Society

 
Scilloideae
Asparagaceae genera
Plants described in 1821